The MacCharlie is a hardware add-on for the Apple Macintosh that was made by Dayna Communications. The name refers to an IBM PC advertising campaign of the time featuring Charlie Chaplin's "Little Tramp" character.

It allows users to run DOS software for the IBM PC by clipping a unit onto the chassis of the Macintosh 128K, as well as a keyboard extender to provide the function keys and numeric keypad that are absent from Apple's original keyboard.

The clip-on unit sits to the side of the Mac and, like the contemporary Amiga Sidecar, contains essentially a complete IBM PC compatible with an 8088 processor, 256 KB of RAM (expandable to 640 KB) and a single 5.25" floppy disk drive that stores 360 KB. A second floppy drive can be added.

While running DOS software, users can still access the Macintosh menu bar and desk accessories. However, the DOS environment, which runs in a window, is text-only and does not permit Macintosh applications to run concurrently while in use. MacCharlie uses the Mac as a terminal, performing all DOS processing itself, and sends video data over a relatively slow serial link to the Mac for display. This slowness, coupled with the declining prices of real IBM PC compatibles, contributed to the short market life of the MacCharlie.

See also
 Amiga Sidecar

References

External links

1985 Advertisement hosted by The Mac Mothership
Personal Computers;   linking Mac to the I.B.M. PC , 1985 review article at the New York Times 

IBM PC compatibles
Macintosh peripherals
Macintosh platform
Products introduced in 1985